Thomas & Maureen Fischer are the founders of Little Mary’s Hospitality House, which is one of the world’s only free vacation resort ministries for families with children battling life-threatening, debilitating, or terminal illness. The couple lives in Wellston, Michigan, which is also the site of the ministry venue they established in 1982.

The couple are past recipients of the Amway Good Neighbor award, presented to them for their work in ministry to critically ill children from all over the United States and as far away as Jamaica, the Netherlands, and Romania.

Published works

Maureen Fischer, Little Mary (East Eagle, 1985, 106 ppg.), 
Maureen Fischer, Little Mary’s Cookbook (Little Mary’s, 1997, 20 recipes)

External links
Little Mary’s Hospitality House website
Thank God for Little Mary’s
Cornerstone Students Minister at Retreat for Families with Critically Ill Children
Phi Theta Kappa: Michigan Chapters Embrace a ‘Promising’ Weekend

American Protestant missionaries
Female Christian missionaries
Living people
People from Manistee County, Michigan
Protestant missionaries in the United States
Year of birth missing (living people)